This is a list of all weapons current and former of the United Kingdom.This list will consists of all lists on Wikipedia that deal with weapons of the United Kingdom at a certain period of time for example the Modern day and World War II. This way this list can provide a list of all weapons ever used by the UK.

American Revolutionary War 

 List of infantry weapons in the American Revolution

World War II 

 List of World War II weapons of the United Kingdom

Cold War 

 List of Cold War weapons and land equipment of the United Kingdom

Modern day 

 List of equipment of the British Army
 List of aircraft of the Royal Air Force
 List of missiles of the Royal Air Force
 List of equipment of the Royal Marines
 List of equipment in the Royal Navy

Gallery of evolution for British tanks

See also
 List of British weapon L numbers
 List of wars involving the United Kingdom
List of wars involving England
List of wars involving Scotland

References

Weapons
Military
United Kingdom Weapons